Chuck Johnson may refer to:

 Charles C. Johnson (born 1988), American far-right political activist
 Chuck Johnson (American football) (born 1969), American former National Football League player - see 1992 Denver Broncos season
 Chuck Johnson, a member of the band Orbs
An In Plain Sight character